Buksnes is a former municipality in Nordland county, Norway. The  municipality existed from 1838 until its dissolution in 1963. It comprised the western part of the island of Vestvågøya in what is now Vestvågøy Municipality. The administrative centre was located in the village of Gravdal where the main church for the municipality, Buksnes Church, is located.

History
The municipality of Buksnes was established on 1 January 1838 (see formannskapsdistrikt law). On 1 July 1919, the southern district of Buksnes (population: 2,272) was separated from it to create the new municipality of Hol. The split left Buksnes with 3,188 inhabitants.  During the 1960s, there were many municipal mergers across Norway due to the work of the Schei Committee. On 1 January 1963, the municipality of Buksnes (population: 4,416) was merged with the neighboring municipalities of Borge (population: 4,056), Hol (population: 3,154), and Valberg (population: 662) to create the new Vestvågøy Municipality.

Name
The municipality (originally the parish) is named after the old Buksnes farm (historically: Buxnnæs) since the first Buksnes Church was built there.

Government
The municipal council  of Buksnes was made up of representatives that were elected to four year terms.  The party breakdown of the final municipal council was as follows:

Notable people
Leonhard Christian Borchgrevink Holmboe (1802-1887), a Lutheran clergymen who was the vicar in Buksnes 
Arnold Carl Johansen (1898–1957), a member of the Norwegian Parliament from Nordland 
Gerhard Schøning (1722-1780), a historian
Harald Sverdrup (1923–1992), a poet and children's writer

See also
List of former municipalities of Norway

References

Vestvågøy
Former municipalities of Norway
1838 establishments in Norway
1963 disestablishments in Norway